The qualifying match for the 1994 FIFA World Cup between Argentina and Colombia is a historic football match played on 5 September 1993. It was the last day of qualifying matches in the 1994 FIFA World Cup qualification – group A of the South American qualifiers. Argentina, in that time second of the group, needed to win in order to not play the intercontinental play-off against Australia. If Argentina didn't win, the qualification to the World Cup depended on the result of the other match of the group (being held in Lima on the same day) between Peru and Paraguay. For its part, Colombia being the first of its group could reach the qualification with a win or a draw. Colombia won 5–0.

This is a game highly remembered for the Colombian, Argentinian, Paraguayan and Peruvian fans, with a historical importance and significance for winning in Argentina to a two-times World champion and in that time undefeated two-time champion of the 1991 and 1993 Copa América as well as the 1992 FIFA Confederations Cup. In addition, Argentina's six-year undefeated streak on home soil was broken. Prior to this game, Argentina have never conceded five goals and have never lost on home soil in a World Cup qualifier match. The game has become a milestone in Colombia's football history. After winning this game, Colombia reached its third appearance in a World Cup after playing the 1962 and 1990 editions.

The game was played in Buenos Aires at the Monumental Stadium before about 75,000 spectators, refereed by Uruguayan Ernesto Filippi, replacing the Chilean Carlos Robles. The match was broadcast in Colombia by Cadena Uno (current Canal Uno) through the program Gol Caracol of the then-programadora Caracol Televisión and in Argentina by Canal 13.

Before the game 
The situation of the group before the game was as follows:

Colombia was first of the group with 8 points, product of two draws and three wins (in that time, for a win were given two points to the winner). Argentina was in second place, with seven points, product of three wins, one draw and one defeat.

Permutations were as follows:

 Colombia would qualify by avoiding defeat.
 Argentina would qualify by defeating Colombia.
 Paraguay cannot qualify directly but could qualify for the inter-continental play-off should they defeat Peru and Colombia defeat Argentina.
 Peru was eliminated.

Both teams had met in the first leg in Barranquilla (15 August 1993) with 2–1 victory for Colombia. The scorers for Colombia were Iván Valenciano and Adolfo "Tren" Valencia; Argentina scored one goal by Ramón Medina Bello.

The game 

The match began with insults and slander by the Argentinian fans towards the Colombian team. A few days before the crucial match, Diego Maradona launched a phrase during a television interview: while putting palms of the hands parallel to the ground at chest height, one above the other, said "You can't change history, history shouldn't be changed: Argentina up, Colombia down." In Argentina it was exaggerated think about going to the playoffs against the winner of Oceania's qualifying.

The Argentinian team began dominating the match with several arrivals with danger of goal, but the Colombian goalkeeper Oscar Córdoba perfectly conjured Argentinian options. When the Argentinian goal seemed sure to come, Colombia began to control the game and at halftime was winning 1–0, thanks to the speed and accuracy of the player Freddy Rincón after a precise pass from Carlos Valderrama in the minute 41.

For the second half Colombia took Argentina's need and scored the other four goals, as follows:

 49': Faustino Asprilla (0–2)
 72': Freddy Rincón, after a pass form Leonel Álvarez. (0–3)
 74': Faustino Asprilla, after a failed Argentina's ball delivery in midfield. (0–4)
 84': Adolfo Valencia, after a pass from Asprilla. (0–5)

While the Argentinian public wasn't believing what was happening, Colombia managed to close a historic day for the Colombian football and world football.

Match details

After the game 
After the game, the group results were as follows:

With the win, Colombia automatically qualified for the 1994 FIFA World Cup, while Argentina had to play the intercontinental play-off against Australia to define their qualification for the World Cup because Paraguay had a 2−2 draw against Peru.

Argentine sports magazine El Gráfico published a black cover after the game titled "Vergüenza" (Shame) without background images. Fifteen years later, for Fox Sports, the 5–0 is "one of the most thunderous beatings suffered by the 'albiceleste' in its history, and was also the end of a six-year winning streak at home". After the match ended, Argentinian spectators, among whom was Diego Maradona, were applauding the Colombian team for several minutes.

Argentina's defeat against Colombia in this match was the first time in history that the Albiceleste lost at home, and the first time it lost in the Monumental in a World Cup qualifier. The squad remained unbeaten at home 33 matches until, curiously, another 5 September (of 2009) suffered the second defeat in its history, this time against Brazil (3−1) in the city of Rosario. The 5−0 was the first time that Argentina lost by a landslide in the history of World Cup qualifying until its defeat of 1 April 2009 against Bolivia in La Paz, with Diego Maradona as coach (6−1).

Argentina's national team did not lose in the Monumental Stadium for official matches until 8 October 2015, when the team was defeated by Ecuador (2−0). Later, in the qualifiers it played just two games out of the stadium (for qualifying) without being able to win (in 1997 they drew 1−1 against Colombia in La Bombonera and in 2009 lost 3−1 against Brazil in the stadium Gigante de Arroyito). This streak was reversed in 2012, beating Paraguay in Córdoba and Uruguay in Mendoza. For its part, Colombia has been unable to win again to Argentina in visitor status since then.

In the final tournament itself, Argentina was eliminated in the round of 16 by Romania after Diego Maradona, who returned to the team following the 5−0 loss, was expelled from the tournament after it was discovered that he had failed a drug test, as he had ephedrine, a weight loss drug, in his blood. As for Colombia, they ended up getting eliminated in the group stage partially due to an own goal against host nation United States scored by Andrés Escobar, who was then murdered five days later after returning home.

The five-goal margin of defeat for this match is Argentina's largest losing deficit in any match, and is Argentina's third of only five matches in which the national team has lost by a margin of five goals; their first five-goal loss occurred at the 1958 FIFA World Cup in Sweden, where they lost 6−1 to Czechoslovakia; their second five-goal loss was a 5−0 loss to Uruguay a year later in 1959; their fourth five-goal loss was a 6−1 loss to Bolivia in a qualification match for the 2010 FIFA World Cup in La Paz, Bolivia; their fifth and most recent five-goal loss was a 6−1 loss to Spain in a friendly match in Madrid, Spain, that acted as a warm-up preparation match for the 2018 FIFA World Cup.

References

External links

 Memorias del día que Colombia goleó 5:0 a Argentina, El Tiempo (in Spanish)
 RSSSF page about the 1994 FIFA World Cup qualifiers
 Video of 5:0
 Video in which Sergio Goycochea is blamed for the result (in Spanish)
 Another video of the 5:0
 Colombia 93, Flashback, El Gráfico (in Spanish)

CONMEBOL
FIFA World Cup qualification matches
Colombia national football team matches
Argentina national football team matches
Colombia at the 1994 FIFA World Cup
Argentina at the 1994 FIFA World Cup
September 1993 sports events in South America
Football in Buenos Aires